Ariyalur North is a village in the Ariyalur taluk of Ariyalur district, Trichy Region, Tamil Nadu, India.

Demographics 

 census, Ariyalur (North) had a total population of 3,221 with 1,608 males and 1,613 females.

References 

Villages in Ariyalur district